Harutaeographa odavissa is a moth of the family Noctuidae. It is found in China (Shaanxi: Taibaishan, Tsinling Mts., Hubei: Daba Shan, Sichuan: Daxue Shan, Gongga Shan, Volong Reserve, Siguliang Shan, Qingcheng Shan).

References

Moths described in 2010
Orthosiini